is a science fiction adventure film which premiered on March 7, 1998 in Japan, based on the 18th volume of the same name of the Doraemon Long Stories series. It won Best Animation Film at the 1998 Mainichi Film Awards and was also nominated for best animation film in the Japanese Media Arts Festival. In late 2014, Disney XD in Southeast Asia produced and aired an English dub version of this movie.
It is the first Doraemon movie after the death of Fujiko F. Fujio. It's the 19th Doraemon film.

Plot 
Nobita Nobi and his friends are discussing school project themed around seas and oceans. Interested in pirate life and treasury, Nobita asks Doraemon to help him find secret treasures. Doraemon at first denies the pirates roaming in the present day as well as the existence of secret treasures, but after learning news about recently discovered treasury, he helps Nobita in his sea voyage in search for the secret treasure. Bringing along Shizuka Minamoto, Takeshi "Gian" Goda, and Suneo Honekawa, they roam the Pacific Ocean while playing ship and sea danger simulators with Doraemon's gadgets.

However, Doraemon senses a time distortion that takes the group to the 16th century when real dangerous phenomena and sea monsters begin appearing. When a whirlpool destroys the group's ship, Nobita goes missing due to drowning and floating away, while the others are rescued by 16th century-pirates boarding a huge pirate ship. All but a few of Doraemon's gadgets are gone following the whirlpool incident and they must assist the pirates in rescuing their comrades, with a female pirate named Betty having lost track of her brother and father, who is the leader of the company. Although Doraemon's treasure map is torn in half, the pirates learn that their map is exactly the same as their own treasure map, confirming the existence of the secret treasures.

Meanwhile, a drowned Nobita is rescued by a dolphin and taken to an island where Betty's younger brother, Jack lives. Although Nobita is unable to converse with Jack due to a language barrier, the two befriend and Nobita learns the dolphin's name, Ruffin, as well as the fact that Jack is also separated from his family, like himself. The pirate company eventually arrives at the island and begins searching for Nobita and Jack. One by one, the pirates and Doraemon's company are attacked and captured by the island's inhabitants, which Doraemon notes as being uncannily similar to a pirate simulator created in the 22nd century.

After Riffin catches a glimpse of the other torn half of treasure map owned by Nobita, it quickly leads Nobita and Jack to a 22nd-century-underground facility, but are captured by security guards. It is revealed that the facility is run by a 22nd-century businessman named Cash, who creates and sells genetically altered animals for money with the help of a scientist, Dr. Clone. Ruffin is taken to be experimented in Dr. Clone's laboratory, while Nobita and Jack are thrown to jail and reunited with Doraemon and the pirate company.

Two pirates of the pirate company who are not captured stage a plan to bail the others as well as the pirates captured earlier, including Betty and Jack's father, out. They eventually manage to do that, and Nobita and his friends go to break the control system and free Ruffin. Cash orders the genetically altered animals to attack the company, but they manage to defeat all of them. Eventually, Cash's masterpiece, a sea monster breaks out and attacks the group. The sea monster swallows Doraemon and Cash, but the former manages to get himself and Cash out through a pinch gadget. The sea monster crashes into the walls of the cave which contains the facility, effectively flooding it as well as the rest of the island.

As the island starts sinking, the company escapes from the island with the help of Ruffin and its other dolphin friends. Cash is arrested by the Future Time Patrols summoned by Ruffin, who is revealed to be a secret agent of them who was sent to bust out Cash and his associates. The pirates, having recovered their leader, Betty and Jack's father, are now rich as they have found the secret treasures on the island. Bidding the pirates goodbye, Nobita and his friends return to the present time as they see that the pirates have erected a sail featuring Doraemon's face on it.

Cast

Release
The film was released in the theatres of Japan on 7 March 1998.

References

External links 
 Doraemon The Movie 25th page 
 

Films directed by Tsutomu Shibayama
Nobita's South Sea Adventure
1998 anime films
1998 films
Pirate films
1990s adventure films
1990s children's animated films
Films set in Oceania